is a Japanese rower. He competed in the men's lightweight coxless four event at the 2000 Summer Olympics.

References

1976 births
Living people
Japanese male rowers
Olympic rowers of Japan
Rowers at the 2000 Summer Olympics
Sportspeople from Miyagi Prefecture
Asian Games medalists in rowing
Rowers at the 1998 Asian Games
Asian Games silver medalists for Japan
Medalists at the 1998 Asian Games